John Daniel Robins (September 8, 1884 - December 15, 1952) was a Canadian academic and humorist. A longtime professor of German and English literature at the University of Toronto's Victoria University, he was most noted for his book The Incomplete Anglers, which was co-winner with E. K. Brown's On Canadian Poetry of the Governor General's Award for English-language non-fiction at the 1943 Governor General's Awards.

Robins was born in Windsor, Ontario, and educated at the University of Toronto and the University of Chicago. In 1914 he attended the Universities of Freiburg and Marburg. He returned to Toronto where he taught German at Victoria College. In 1916 he resigned to enlist in the Canadian Army. He spent the next two years teaching musketry at Camp Borden. He left the army in 1918 with the rank of company sergeant major. He returned to teaching at Victoria College eventually becoming a full professor in 1941. He obtained a PhD at the University of Chicago in 1927. In 1917, he married Leila Isabella Douglas.

In addition to The Incomplete Anglers, his other publications included the anthologies A Pocketful of Canada (1946) and A Book of Canadian Humor (1951), the novel Cottage Cheese (1951) and the posthumous short fiction collection Logging with Paul Bunyan (1957). He served as a judge for the inaugural Stephen Leacock Award.

References

External links
 
 

1884 births
1952 deaths
20th-century Canadian male writers
20th-century Canadian novelists
20th-century Canadian short story writers
Canadian male novelists
Canadian male short story writers
Canadian humorists
Canadian anthologists
Canadian folklorists
Governor General's Award-winning non-fiction writers
University of Chicago alumni
University of Toronto alumni
Academic staff of the University of Toronto
Writers from Windsor, Ontario
Canadian male non-fiction writers